Charles "Chuck" McRae (born c. 1939) is an American retired judge. He served as a justice of the Supreme Court of Mississippi from November 1990 to January 2004.

Early life and education
He graduated from Marietta College in Marietta, Ohio and taught in Mississippi and Florida.

Career

McRae worked as a lawyer in Gulfport, Mississippi.

He ran for a seat on the court occupied by Joel Blass, who had been appointed to a seat vacated by the death of judge Ruble Griffin. McRae saturated the media with campaign ads and toured the state to defeat Blass in the Democratic primary. McRae ran for reelection in 1994, winning by default after his initial Republican opponent withdrew to accept another office, and the substitution of another candidate was ruled to be in violation of the election statute.

He was censured in 1997. A 2003 Forbes article describes him as favoring plaintiffs and having received most of his campaign funding from plaintiff lawyers. It describes his successor, Jess Dickinson, as being more favorable to business.

Personal life
In 2017 he was hospitalized after a scuba diving accident. He rides a motorcycle. He has one daughter.

See also
List of justices of the Supreme Court of Mississippi

References

Justices of the Mississippi Supreme Court
Year of birth missing (living people)
Living people
Marietta College alumni
People from Gulfport, Mississippi
20th-century American lawyers
20th-century American judges
Mississippi Democrats